Brühl palace can refer to several buildings owned by Heinrich (Henryk) von Brühl:
 three palaces in Warsaw
 Brühl palace, Warsaw (destroyed in 1944, near Piłsudski's Square)
 Brühl palace, Młociny (in Bielany district of Warsaw)
 Brühl palace, Wola (in Wola district, destroyed in the 19th century)
 Brühl palace, Brody (in the city of Brody near Lublin)

See also 
 Brühl (disambiguation)
 Augustusburg and Falkenlust Palaces in Brühl (Rhineland)
 Brühl's Terrace in Dresden